Mac Beathaidh mac Ainmire (died 1041) was an Irish poet and Chief Ollam of Ireland.

Little is known of his life, other than his obituary description in various historical documents:
In the Annals of the Four Masters:  "M1041.4 Mac Beathaidh, son of Ainmire, chief poet of Ard-Macha, and of Ireland in general, died."
In the Annals of Ulster: "U1041.2 Bethad son of Ainmire, chief ollav of Ard Macha and Ireland as well, died."
In the Annals of Loch Cé: "LC1041.2 Mac Bethaidh, son of Bethadh, son of Ainmire, chief poet of Ard-Macha, and likewise of Erinn, died."
In the Annals of Tigernach:"T1041.6 Mac Ainmere aird-bretheam Aird Macha & tuile eolais Erenn obít. [ Mac Ainmbre, chief judge of Armagh and a flood of Ireland's lore, died ]."

External links
 http://www.ucc.ie/celt/published/T100001A/index.html

People from County Armagh
Medieval Irish poets
11th-century Irish poets
11th-century Irish writers
1041 deaths
Year of birth unknown
Irish male poets